Nuno Herlander Simões Espírito Santo (born 25 January 1974), often referred to as simply Nuno, is a Portuguese football manager and former footballer who played as a goalkeeper. He is currently the manager of Saudi Professional League club Al-Ittihad.

During his career he first made a name for himself in Spain, playing for three teams in five years. He later returned to Portugal to represent Porto, and also played professionally in Russia; he was part of the Portuguese squad at UEFA Euro 2008, but never won a cap for the national team.

Espírito Santo started his coaching career at Greek club Panathinaikos as an assistant. He became a coach in 2012, leading Portuguese club Rio Ave to both domestic cup finals in 2014. After brief spells at Valencia in Spain's La Liga, and a return to Porto, he managed Wolverhampton Wanderers for four years. In 2021, he took over as manager of Tottenham Hotspur, but was relieved of his duties after four months in charge.

Club career

Early career / Deportivo
Born in São Tomé, Portuguese São Tomé and Príncipe, Nuno started his football career with Vitória S.C. in Guimarães. After a meeting with the then Porto nightclub owner Jorge Mendes he became the agent's first client in 1996; Mendes brokered a $1 million transfer the following January to La Liga's Deportivo de La Coruña, but Nuno spent three of his six seasons in Galicia out on loan, backing up Jacques Songo'o (1996–98) and José Francisco Molina (2001–02) when he was part of the team. He was the preferred goalkeeper for the winning campaign in the Copa del Rey in the latter season, but Javier Irureta played Molina in the final victory over Real Madrid.

In 1999–2000, as he represented CP Mérida in the Spanish second division, Nuno won the Ricardo Zamora Trophy and helped the team finish sixth, but it would be relegated to the third level due to irregularities. The following season he was loaned to CA Osasuna, going on to rank seventh in the Zamora as his team finished only one point above the relegation zone in the top tier.

Porto
José Mourinho's FC Porto paid €3 million to bring Nuno back to the country in July 2002, as part of the deal that saw Jorge Andrade join Deportivo. During a 2003 Taça de Portugal match against Varzim SC, he was allowed by Mourinho to convert a penalty kick, scoring the club's last goal in a 7–0 home routing. In May 2004, Nuno was an unused substitute as Porto won the UEFA Champions League final. On 12 December 2004, he replaced club great Vítor Baía during extra time of the Intercontinental Cup final penalty shoot-out victory against Once Caldas; however, in January, he was sold to Russian Premier League's FC Dynamo Moscow.

Again in January, in 2007, Nuno returned to Portugal for a stint with C.D. Aves, eventually relegated from the Primeira Liga. In July he returned to Porto, backing up Brazilian Helton during most of his spell. Despite his limited involvement on the pitch – earning him the nickname O Substituto – he was considered a leader of the club.

Nuno again played second-fiddle to Helton during the 2008–09 season appearing in only four games, but was the starter throughout the domestic cup campaign, including the final win (1–0) against F.C. Paços de Ferreira.

International career
Nuno represented Portugal at the 1996 Summer Olympics, playing four matches for the fourth-placed team. He also played for the nation's B team. Uncapped, he was called to the full squad competing in UEFA Euro 2008, replacing the injured Quim.

Coaching career

Beginnings
On 21 June 2010, Porto announced Nuno's contract would not be renewed. The 36-year-old said he would always support Porto as he left. After his retirement he rejoined former Porto manager Jesualdo Ferreira, moving to Málaga CF as a goalkeeping coach; the pair signed for Panathinaikos FC in November 2010.

Rio Ave
In May 2012, Rio Ave F.C. sacked manager Carlos Brito and announced the appointment of Espírito Santo. In his second season in charge, the team reached both the Taça de Portugal and Taça da Liga finals, therefore leading them to the UEFA Europa League for the first time in their history.

Valencia

Espírito Santo signed a one-year contract with Valencia CF in La Liga on 4 July 2014, replacing the fired Juan Antonio Pizzi. On 12 January 2015, he agreed to an extension to keep him at the club until 2018, and he eventually led them to a fourth place finish in his first year, highlights including a 2–1 home win over Real Madrid and a 2–2 away draw against the same opponent, while he was named La Liga Manager of the Month three times; he resigned on 29 November 2015, following a 0–1 away defeat to Sevilla FC, after a poor start to both Valencia's La Liga and Champions League campaigns.

Porto
On 1 June 2016, Espírito Santo signed a two-year contract with Porto, replacing former head coach José Peseiro. The following 22 May, however, after a season devoid of silverware which included a second place in the league, he was relieved of his duties.

Wolverhampton Wanderers
On 31 May 2017, Espírito Santo was named as the new head coach of then EFL Championship club Wolverhampton Wanderers, signing a three-year deal. He was voted the competition's Manager of the Month in November as his team won all four of their games, scoring 13 times. Espírito Santo led the club to the Premier League after a six-year absence, achieving promotion with four matches remaining in the season and being confirmed as champions with two games to spare. On 10 July 2018, it was announced that his contract had been extended until 2021.

Espírito Santo was awarded the Premier League Manager of the Month title in his second month managing in the English top division after his team went unbeaten in September 2018, accruing ten points from four matches and only conceding one goal. It was the first time that a Wolverhampton Wanderers manager had secured the award, in the club's fifth season in the competition. Wolves finished seventh in the 2018–19 league season; it was the club's highest Premier League rank and their highest in the English top-flight since the 1979–80 season when they finished sixth. Wolves also qualified for a European competition for the first time since 1980–81, reaching the UEFA Europa League.

Espírito Santo was awarded the Premier League Manager of the Month title for a second time on 10 July 2020 for a run of five fixtures unbeaten between the beginning of March and the end of June, sandwiching the temporary suspension of the 2019–20 Premier League due to the COVID-19 pandemic in the United Kingdom. The run included four wins and four clean sheets. The 2019–20 season saw Espírito Santo's team achieve a second consecutive seventh-place finish in the Premier League (with a record points total for Wolves in the Premier League of 59), and reach the quarter-finals of the UEFA Europa League, the club's best such performance since being finalists in 1971–72.

On 13 September 2020, at the outset of the 2020–21 season, Espírito Santo's contract at the club was extended until summer 2023. He was Premier League Manager of the Month for October with a run of four fixtures unbeaten, including three wins without conceding; this was his third such award. On 27 February 2021, he took charge of his 102nd Premier League game as Wolves head coach as his team played out a 1–1 draw with Newcastle United at St. James' Park, surpassing Mick McCarthy as the longest-serving Wolves head coach in the Premier League era. On 21 May 2021, Wolves announced that Espírito Santo would be leaving the club by mutual consent at the end of the season.

Tottenham Hotspur
On 30 June 2021, Tottenham Hotspur announced Espírito Santo as their new head coach on a two-year contract with an option to extend for a third year. On his debut on 15 August, the side won 1–0 at home against reigning champions Manchester City through a Son Heung-min goal. On 29 August, he achieved the best start to a Premier League season for Tottenham after beating Watford to secure three wins from their first three matches. He won the Premier League Manager of the Month award for August 2021, the fourth of his career. Despite this, on 1 November 2021, he was sacked following a run of poor results which saw Tottenham lose five in seven Premier League games. He was replaced by Antonio Conte the following day.

Al-Ittihad
On 4 July 2022, Espírito Santo was appointed by Al-Ittihad Club (Jeddah) in the Saudi Professional League. He held talks for a return to Wolverhampton in October.

Personal life
Espírito Santo and his wife Sandra have three children as of 2020. On 4 May 2019, he was awarded an Honorary Doctorate in Sport by the University of Wolverhampton.

Managerial statistics

Honours

Player
Deportivo
Copa del Rey: 2001–02

Porto
Primeira Liga: 2002–03, 2003–04, 2007–08, 2008–09
Taça de Portugal: 2002–03, 2008–09
Supertaça Cândido de Oliveira: 2003, 2004, 2009
UEFA Champions League: 2003–04
UEFA Cup: 2002–03
Intercontinental Cup: 2004
Taça da Liga runner-up: 2009–10

Individual
Ricardo Zamora Trophy: 1999–2000 (Segunda División)

Manager
Wolverhampton Wanderers
EFL Championship: 2017–18

Al-Ittihad
Saudi Super Cup: 2022

Individual
La Liga Manager of the Month: September 2014, December 2014, February 2015
EFL Championship Manager of the Month: November 2017
LMA Manager of the Year: 2017–18 EFL Championship
Premier League Manager of the Month: September 2018, June 2020, October 2020, August 2021

References

External links

 

1974 births
Living people
Portuguese people of São Tomé and Príncipe descent
People from São Tomé
Black Portuguese sportspeople
Portuguese footballers
Association football goalkeepers
Vitória S.C. players
FC Porto players
Deportivo de La Coruña players
CP Mérida footballers
CA Osasuna players
FC Dynamo Moscow players
C.D. Aves players
Primeira Liga players
Segunda Divisão players
La Liga players
Segunda División players
Russian Premier League players
UEFA Champions League winning players
UEFA Europa League winning players
Portugal youth international footballers
Portugal under-21 international footballers
Olympic footballers of Portugal
Footballers at the 1996 Summer Olympics
UEFA Euro 2008 players
Portuguese expatriate footballers
Portuguese expatriate sportspeople in Spain
Portuguese expatriate sportspeople in Russia
Expatriate footballers in Spain
Expatriate footballers in Russia
Portuguese football managers
Rio Ave F.C. managers
FC Porto managers
Valencia CF managers
Wolverhampton Wanderers F.C. managers
Tottenham Hotspur F.C. managers
Primeira Liga managers
La Liga managers
English Football League managers
Premier League managers
Saudi Professional League managers
Portuguese expatriate football managers
Portuguese expatriate sportspeople in England
Portuguese expatriate sportspeople in Saudi Arabia
Expatriate football managers in Spain
Expatriate football managers in England
Expatriate football managers in Saudi Arabia
Portugal B international footballers